Salma Amani (born 28 November 1989) is a Moroccan footballer who plays as a midfielder for Division 2 Féminine club Metz and the Morocco women's national team. She also holds French citizenship.

International career
Amani capped for Morocco at senior level during the 2016 Africa Women Cup of Nations qualification (first round).

See also
List of Morocco women's international footballers

References

1989 births
Living people
Footballers from Rabat
Moroccan women's footballers
Women's association football midfielders
Morocco women's international footballers
Moroccan emigrants to France
Naturalized citizens of France
French women's footballers
Division 1 Féminine players
En Avant Guingamp (women) players
France women's youth international footballers
Dijon FCO (women) players